Cerasicoccus frondis is a Gram-negative, chemoheterotrophic bacterium from the genus of Cerasicoccus which has been isolated from seawater.

References

Verrucomicrobiota
Bacteria described in 2010